A beehive oven is a type of oven in use since the Middle Ages in Europe. It gets its name from its domed shape, which resembles that of a skep, an old-fashioned type of beehive.

Its apex of popularity occurred in the Americas and Europe all the way until the Industrial Revolution, which saw the advent of gas and electric ovens. Beehive ovens were common in households used for baking pies, cakes and meat. These ovens were also used in industry, in such applications as making tiles and pots and turning coal into coke.

Construction 

A fire brick chamber shaped like a dome is used. The roof has a hole for charging the coal or other kindling from the top. The discharging hole is provided in the circumference of the lower part of the wall. In a coke oven battery, a number of ovens are built in a row with common walls between neighboring ovens. A battery consisted of a great many ovens, sometimes hundreds of ovens, in a row. Some mines also employed parallel batteries.

Cooking food 

With candle wax wrapped in paper, dry kindling (twigs, small sticks, and/or wood chips), and pine cones, a small fire was made toward the front of the oven. As the fire caught, more kindling was added to produce a thick smoke, which coated the oven with black soot. The fire was then pushed back into the middle of the oven with a hoe. More wood would be added until there was a good, hot fire. After all of these steps were taken, the food would be prepared for baking.

The beehive oven typically took two to three hours to heat, occasionally even four hours in the winter. Breads were baked first when the beehive oven was hottest, with other baked items such as cinnamon buns, cakes, and pies. As the oven cooled, muffins and "biscuits" could be baked, along with puddings and custards. After a day's baking there was typically sufficient heat to dry apples and other fruits, vegetables, or herbs. Pots of beans were often placed in the back of the oven to cook slowly overnight.

Coke manufacture 

Air is supplied initially to ignite the coal. Carbonization starts and produces volatile matter, which burns inside the partially closed side door. Carbonization proceeds from top to bottom and is completed in two to three days. Heat is supplied by the burning volatile matter so no by-products are recovered. The exhaust gases are allowed to escape to the atmosphere. The hot coke is quenched with water and discharged, manually through the side door. The walls and roof retain enough heat to initiate carbonization of the next charge.

When coal was burned in a coke oven, the impurities of the coal not already driven off as gases accumulated to form slag, which was effectively a conglomeration of the removed impurities. Since it was not the desired coke product, slag was initially nothing more than an unwanted by-product and was discarded. Later, however, it was found to have many beneficial uses and has since been used as an ingredient in brick-making, mixed cement, granule-covered shingles, and even as a fertilizer.

History 

In the Thirteen Colonies that later became the United States, most households had a beehive oven. Bread was usually baked in it once a week,  often in conjunction with pies, crackers, or other baked goods. To heat the oven, the baker would heap coals and kindling inside and wait several hours. Requiring strict regulation, the right amount of wood to ash had to be burned and then tested by sticking one's hands inside. Then one had to add more wood or open the door to let it cool to the right temperature.

Beehive ovens were also used in iron-making. Before this time, iron-making utilized large quantities of charcoal, produced by burning wood. As forests dwindled dangerously, the substitution of coke for charcoal became common in Great Britain, and the coke was manufactured by burning coal in heaps on the ground in such a way that only the outer layer burned, leaving the interior of the pile in a carbonized state. In the late 19th century, brick beehive ovens were developed, which allowed more control over the burning process.

The number of beehive ovens between 1870 and 1905 skyrocketed from about 200 to almost 31,000, which produced nearly 18 million tons of coke in the Pittsburgh area alone. One observer boasted that, loaded into a train, "the year's production would make up a train so long that the engine in front of it would go to San Francisco and come back to Connellsville before the caboose had gotten started out of the Connellsville yards!" The number of beehive ovens in the Pittsburgh seam peaked in 1910 at almost 48,000.

Although they made a top-quality fuel, beehive ovens poisoned the surrounding landscape. After 1900, the serious environmental damage of beehive coking attracted national notice, even though the damage had plagued the district for decades. "The smoke and gas from some ovens destroy all vegetation around the small mining communities," noted W. J. Lauck of the U.S. Immigration Commission in 1911. Passing through the region on train, University of Wisconsin president Charles van Hise saw "long rows of beehive ovens from which flame is bursting and dense clouds of smoke issuing, making the sky dark. By night the scene is rendered indescribably vivid by these numerous burning pits. The beehive ovens make the entire region of coke manufacture one of dulled sky, cheerless and unhealthful".

In China, beehive ovens were not banned until 1996, and this ban was not fully effective until 2011.

References

External links 

 
 The Manufacture of Coke in a Beehive Coke Oven
 The History of Beehive Ovens in West Blocton, Alabama
 Hearthcook.com

Steelmaking
Ovens
Fireplaces